Maoist Bolshevik Reorganisation Movement of the Purba Banglar Sarbahara Party is an underground communist party in Bangladesh. It was formed in 2001, following a split from the Purba Banglar Sarbahara Party. Following the formation of PBSP(MBRM), the party revived the agrarian struggles of PBSP in the Rajbari area, seizing 3,000 bighas of land and distributing them among landless peasants. Two police camps were set up in the area to counter the influence of the party.

PBSP(MBRM) attended the 2004 CCOMPOSA conference as an observer. Moreover, the group has initiated contacts with the Maoist sectors that considers the Revolutionary Internationalist Movement as having taken a liquidationist direction. In November 2004 PBSP(MBRM) took part in an international conference in Malmö, Sweden, which was organized by opponents to the RIM leadership.

In November 2015, Sahinur Rahman, described as a 'top leader' of the party, was killed by police in Rajbari. In April 2018, Saidul, a local commander of the party in Rajbari, was killed by police.

References

External links
PBSP(MBRM) document, issued ahead of the 2004 conference

Communist militant groups
Communist parties in Bangladesh
Maoist parties
Coordination Committee of Maoist Parties and Organisations of South Asia
Maoist organisations in Bangladesh